Jessica Sharpe may refer to:

Jessica Sharpe, character in Body Politic (TV pilot)
Jessica Sharpe, contestant on The Voice (U.S. season 3)